Sawbill Lake is a lake in Cook County, Minnesota. The closest town to Sawbill Lake is Tofte. It is a popular entry point (number 38) to the Boundary Waters Canoe Area Wilderness in the Superior National Forest. Sawbill is a nickname of the common merganser duck. There is a United States Forest Service cabin, a canoe outfitter, and a campground located at the southern end of the lake. During the Great Depression there was a Civilian Conservation Corps camp six miles south of the lake.

Sawbill has portages connecting it to Smoke Lake, Kelso Lake, Ada Creek and Alton Lake.

Wildlife 
At Sawbill Lake, there are moose, bears, bald eagles, and loons.

References

External links
Sawbill Canoe Outfitters - Outfitter located on Sawbill Lake and operates Forest Service Sawbill Lake Campground
Sawbill Lake on the BWCAWiki
USFS Superior National Forest

Lakes of Cook County, Minnesota
Lakes of Minnesota
Tourist attractions in Cook County, Minnesota
Superior National Forest